Alaska Township is a township in Beltrami County, Minnesota, United States. The population was 197 as of the 2000 census. Alaska Township was named by settlers who had recently returned from a trip to Alaska.

Geography

Unincorporated towns
 Island Lake at 
(This list is based on USGS data and may include former settlements.)

Major highway
  Minnesota State Highway 89

Lakes
 Alaska Lake (east half)
 Balm Lake
 Barr Lake
 Crookston Lake
 Dellwater Lake
 Fahul Lake (west quarter)
 Fessland Lake
 Frisby Lake (east edge)
 Haggerty Lake (east edge)
 Island Lake
 Mina Lake
 Moose Lake
 Parks Lake
 Pickerel Lake
 Rice Lake
 Rice Lake (west three-quarters)
 Sylvia Lake (east three-quarters)
 Ten Mile Lake

Adjacent townships
 Nebish Township (east)
 Maple Ridge Township (southeast)
 Roosevelt Township (southwest)
 Clover Township, Clearwater County (west)
 Sinclair Township, Clearwater County (west)

Cemeteries
The township contains Island Lake Cemetery.

Demographics
As of the census of 2000, there were 197 people, 81 households, and 54 families residing in the township.  The population density was 6.1 people per square mile (2.4/km).  There were 135 housing units at an average density of 4.2/sq mi (1.6/km).  The racial makeup of the township was 90.86% White, 2.03% Native American, and 7.11% from two or more races.

There were 81 households, out of which 22.2% had children under the age of 18 living with them, 55.6% were married couples living together, 8.6% had a female householder with no husband present, and 33.3% were non-families. 29.6% of all households were made up of individuals, and 14.8% had someone living alone who was 65 years of age or older.  The average household size was 2.43 and the average family size was 2.96.

In the township the age distribution of the population shows 22.3% under the age of 18, 8.6% from 18 to 24, 19.3% from 25 to 44, 31.5% from 45 to 64, and 18.3% who were 65 years of age or older.  The median age was 44 years. For every 100 females, there were 103.1 males.  For every 100 females age 18 and over, there were 109.6 males.

The median income for a household in the township was $40,313, and the median income for a family was $53,750. Males had a median income of $31,875 versus $19,063 for females. The per capita income for the township was $16,990.  About 3.5% of families and 13.8% of the population were below the poverty line, including 13.0% of those under the age of eighteen and 20.6% of those 65 or over.

References
 United States National Atlas
 United States Census Bureau 2007 TIGER/Line Shapefiles
 United States Board on Geographic Names (GNIS)

Townships in Beltrami County, Minnesota
Townships in Minnesota